Marjorie Torrey Hood Chanslor (November 10, 1891 – September 1, 1964) was an American illustrator and writer of children's books. She also wrote two mystery novels for adults under the name Torrey Chanslor and published under the name Torrey Bevans. She was a runner-up for the annual American Library Association Caldecott Medal for children's picture book illustration, in both 1946 and 1947; Opal Wheeler wrote both books, Sing Mother Goose and Sing in Praise).

Personal life 
Chanslor was born in Brooklyn in 1891 to William A. Hood (1860–1918) and Caroline Lincoln Torrey (1861–1949).

In 1911, she married Thomas Murray Bevans (1879–1953) in Jersey City, New Jersey. He was previously married to Anna Fessenden Bradley (1900). They had a son, Tom Torre Bevans (1912–2003), who renewed copyright to several of her books in the 1970s. Her son was married to Margaret Van Doren Bevans, also a writer and illustrator.

She married secondly screenwriter Roy Edwin Chanslor (1899–1964), who wrote The Menace. In April 1935, she was fined $1,450 for throwing a cocktail at screenwriter Lon Young at a New Year's Eve party at the Cafe Trocadero nightclub in Los Angeles.

She died on September 1, 1964 in Manhattan, at age 72. There was no service, per her request.

Books

 Sarah's idea (1938), illustrator
 Our First Murder (Frederick A. Stokes, 1940) – mystery fiction for adults, featuring the Beagle Sisters, 
 Our Second Murder (Stokes, 1941), 
 Penny (1944)
 Artie and the Princess (1945)
 Three Little Chipmunks (1947)
 The Merriweathers (1949)
 New star of the show (1949), illustrator
 Alice in Wonderland (1955), illustrator
 Far from Marlborough Street
 Trouble for Jerry Doris Gages, illustrator
 Saturday Night is My Delight
 Sing Mother Goose, written by Opal Wheeler (E. P. Dutton, 1945)
 Sing in Praise: a collection of the best loved hymns, by Opal Wheeler (Dutton, 1946)
 Abide with Me, illustrator
 Hoodoo that Voodoo, illustrator
 Songs to sing with the very young, by Phyllis Brown Ohanian (1966)
 Peter Pan (Random House, Inc. 1957), illustrator,

References

External links
ALSC
 

1891 births
1964 deaths
American children's book illustrators
American mystery novelists
American women novelists
American children's writers
American women children's writers
American women illustrators
20th-century American novelists
20th-century American women writers
Women mystery writers
Writers from Brooklyn
Novelists from New York (state)